Moses Augustino Kiri Gwolo was a South Sudanese political official who served as the commissioner, the deputy governor of Yei River State as well as  the Army Colonel of the South Sudanese Army.

Biography 
Moses Augustino Kiri Gwolo was born in 1973 to the Pojulu tribe of Lainya County to a clan called Bereka in the then Yei River State which now is called Central Equatoria State.

He was later elected as the commissioner of Lainya County.

Leadership and Administration 
Moses Augustino Kiri Gwolo was elected as the commissioner of Lainya County, the deputy governor of Yei River State and served in the South Sudanese Army as a Colonel. He was sworn into office after being considered by the Church a leader.

Contributions 
Moses Augustino Kiri Gwolo was a social activist who contributed to the well being of Yei River State including voicing the concerns of his people over the years he served in office and making amends to provide their needs. Commissioner of Lainya County & Representative of the Government of Central Equatoria State, Moses Augustino Kiri Gwolo voiced the concerns of the local people. According to Radio Tamzuj, he reportedly advocated for his county to be attended to, due to the fact that there were children dying every week because of lack of healthcare in the county.

Death 
In 2017, Moses Augustino Kiri Gwolo died after being diagnosed with yellow fever in the Juba Medical Complex.

References 

1973 births
2017 deaths
South Sudanese activists